Tomaž Dolar (born 27 October 1966) is a Slovenian ski jumper. He competed in the large hill event at the 1984 Winter Olympics.

References

1966 births
Living people
Slovenian male ski jumpers
Olympic ski jumpers of Yugoslavia
Ski jumpers at the 1984 Winter Olympics
Sportspeople from Jesenice, Jesenice